Guusje Steenhuis (born 27 October 1992) is a Dutch judoka. She won the bronze medal in the 78 kg event at the 2015 European Games in Baku. She is the four-time silver medalist of European Judo Championships in the 78 kg division. She competed in the women's 78 kg event at the 2020 Summer Olympics in Tokyo, Japan.

She won the silver medal in the women's 78 kg event at the 2019 European Judo Championships which were held as part of the 2019 European Games in Minsk, Belarus.

In 2021, she won one of the bronze medals in her event at the 2021 Judo World Masters held in Doha, Qatar. A few months later, she won the silver medal in her event at the 2021 European Judo Championships held in Lisbon, Portugal.

She is openly lesbian.

References

External links
 
 

1992 births
Dutch female judoka
Judoka at the 2015 European Games
Judoka at the 2019 European Games
European Games medalists in judo
European Games silver medalists for the Netherlands
European Games bronze medalists for the Netherlands
Sportspeople from Rotterdam
Living people
Judoka at the 2020 Summer Olympics
Olympic judoka of the Netherlands
Dutch LGBT sportspeople
20th-century Dutch women
21st-century Dutch women